Karin Giegerich (born 15 May 1963) is a German actress. She appeared in more than sixty films since 1992.

References

External links 

1963 births
Living people
German film actresses
People from Sorengo
Alumni of the European Schools